Jeremias Benjamin Richter (10 March 1762 – 4 May 1807) was a German chemist. He was born at Hirschberg in Silesia, became a mining official at Breslau in 1794, and in 1800 was appointed assessor to the department of mines and chemist to the royal porcelain factory at Berlin, where he died. He is known for introducing the term stoichiometry.

Developer of titration
He made some of the earliest known determinations of the quantities by weight in which acids saturate bases and bases acids. He realised that those amounts of different bases which can saturate the same quantity of a particular acid are equivalent to each other (see Titration).

He was thus led to conclude that chemistry is a branch of applied mathematics and to endeavour to trace a law according to which the quantities of different bases required to saturate a given acid formed an arithmetical progression, and the quantities of acids saturating a given base a geometric progression.

Law of definite proportions (stoichiometry)
Evidence for the existence of atoms was the law of definite proportions proposed by him in 1792. Richter found that the ratio by weight of the compounds consumed in a chemical reaction was always the same. It took 615 parts by weight of magnesia (MgO), for example, to neutralize 1000 parts by weight of sulfuric acid. From his data, Ernst Gottfried Fischer calculated in 1802 the first table of chemical equivalents, taking sulphuric acid as the standard with the figure 1000. When Joseph Proust reported his work on the constant composition of chemical compounds, the time was ripe for the reinvention of an atomic theory. The law of definite proportions and constant composition do not prove that atoms exist, but they are difficult to explain without assuming that chemical compounds are formed when atoms combine in constant proportions.

Publications
His results were published in Der Stochiometrie oder Messkunst chemischer Elemente (1792–1794), and Über die neueren Gegenstände in der Chemie (1792–1802), but it was long before they were properly appreciated. 
This was partly because some of his work was wrongly ascribed to Carl Wenzel by Jons Berzelius through a mistake which was only corrected in 1841 by Henri Hess, professor of chemistry at St. Petersburg, and author of the laws of constant heat-sums and of thermoneutrality.

Later work
Between 1792 and 1794 he published a three-volume summary of his work on the law of definite proportions. In this book Richter introduced the term stoichiometry, which he defined as the art of chemical measurements, which has to deal with the laws according to which substances unite to form chemical compounds.

Richter was fascinated with the role of mathematics in chemistry. Unfortunately his writing style has been described as obscure and clumsy. His work therefore had little impact until 1802, when it was summarized by Ernst Gottfried Fischer in terms of tables.

Notes

See also
Equivalent weight

References
 (Link not working) 

Attribution

1762 births
1807 deaths
People from Jelenia Góra
People from the Province of Silesia
19th-century German chemists
18th-century German chemists